A Private Heaven is the fifth studio album by Scottish pop singer Sheena Easton, released on 21 September 1984 by EMI America Records. The album featured two US Top 10 hit singles: the lead single "Strut" and the controversial "Sugar Walls". "Swear", a third single, peaked at No. 80.

The album is Easton's most successful studio album in the United States to date, peaking at No. 15 on the US Billboard 200 and selling over one million copies, earning a gold and platinum certification from the RIAA. In Canada, the album also went platinum. The tour that year featured Bruce Hornsby on keyboards in the live band.

Background and legacy
The album marked a conscious effort by Easton to change her image to that of a sexy pop singer after cultivating a "sweet and innocent" image since the launch of her career five years earlier. The sexually-charged "Strut" - co-written by Charlie Dore - became Easton's biggest solo hit in the US since 1981's "For Your Eyes Only". Easton collaborated with Prince on the controversial track "Sugar Walls", written by Prince under the pseudonym Alexander Nevermind. The track and its accompanying video were banned in some regions due to its sexually risqué lyrics and was one of several songs cited by Tipper Gore on her Filthy Fifteen list in her efforts to introduce mandatory warning labeling of explicit musical albums. Easton's musical association with Prince continued for the next few years, with him writing "Eternity" for her eighth studio album, No Sound But a Heart (1987) and Easton later featuring on Prince's single "U Got the Look" in 1987.

The album also includes cover versions of Tim Scott's new wave track "Swear" and Joan Armatrading's 1976 classic "Love and Affection". Converse to the album's success in America, in the UK, it was her first studio album not to chart, and none of the singles released made the official Top 75.

In 2000, One Way Records released a remastered version of A Private Heaven with bonus tracks and B-sides.

On February 23, 2013, Edsel Records (UK) reissued Easton's A Private Heaven and its follow-up studio album Do You (1985) on two CDs remastered with bonus tracks.

On November 24, 2014, the album was included in a box set in the UK with all of her first five albums with EMI through Warner Music Group.

A 2CD deluxe edition of A Private Heaven, remastered from the original master tapes for the first time with 21 bonus tracks, including 12 previously-unreleased tracks, along with 12" mixes and B-sides, was released on 25 February 2022 by Cherry Pop/RT Industries.

Critical reception

Cashbox magazine reviewed the album in October 1984, writing that with "Virtually unlimited talent, Sheena Easton is at her absolute best", describing the album as "dazzling" and featuring "solid, punchy, techno-pop production with dramatic ballads".

Track listing
Side one
"Strut" (Charlie Dore, Julian Littman) – 4:05
"Sugar Walls" (Alexander Nevermind) – 4:01
"Hungry Eyes" (Greg Mathieson, Trevor Veitch) – 3:42
"Hard to Say It's Over" (Adrienne Anderson, Gino Cunico, Tom Saviano) – 4:24
"Swear" (Tim Scott) – 3:43

Side two
"Love and Affection" (Joan Armatrading) – 4:06
"Back in the City" (Greg Mathieson, Lee Ritenour, Trevor Veitch) – 3:46
"You Make Me Nervous" (Mark Holding, Robbie Nevil, Duncan Pain) – 3:53
"All by Myself" (Steve Lukather, Trevor Veitch) – 4:24
"Double Standard" (Steve Kipner, Ben Petterson) – 3:50

The 2022 2CD Deluxe version bonus tracks
The 12” Mixes
"Strut" (Dance Mix) 
"Sugar Walls" (Dance Mix) 
"Swear" (Dance Mix) 
"Strut" (Dub Mix) 
"Sugar Walls" (Red Mix) 
"Swear" (Dub Mix)

The B-Sides
"Letters from the Road" 
"Straight Talking"
"Fallen Angels"

The Studio Sessions (previously unreleased)
"Have You Ever Been in Love"
"Hungry Eyes" (Alternate Version)
"Hard to Say It’s Over" (Alternate Version)
"Sugar Walls" (Long ‘Roman’ Version)

The Instrumental Mixes (previously unreleased)
"Strut" (Instrumental Mix)
"Love and Affection" (Instrumental Mix)
"Hungry Eyes" (Instrumental Mix)
"All by Myself" (Instrumental Mix)
"Back in the City" (Instrumental Mix)
"Hard to Say It’s Over" (Instrumental Mix)
"Straight Talking" (Instrumental Mix)
"In It to Win It" (Instrumental Mix)

Personnel
Credits are adapted from the A Private Heaven liner notes.
 Sheena Easton – lead and backing vocals
 Michael Boddicker – keyboards
 Greg Mathieson – keyboards, arrangements
 Michael Landau – guitars
 Lee Ritenour – guitars
 Steve Lukather – guitars (9)
 Abraham Laboriel – bass
 Carlos Vega – drums
 Lenny Castro – percussion
 Gary Herbig – saxophones
 Larry Williams – saxophones
 Bill Reichenbach Jr. – trombone
 Gary Grant – trumpet
 Jerry Hey – trumpet, horn arrangements
 Steve George – backing vocals
 Tom Kelly – backing vocals
 Richard Page – backing vocals
 Devo – backing vocals

Production
 Producer – Greg Mathieson
 Recorded and Mixed by David Leonard
 Recorded at Sunset Sound Factory (Hollywood, CA).
 Mixed at Sunset Sound (Hollywood, CA).
 Mastered by Wally Traugott at Capitol Mastering (Hollywood, CA).
 Art Direction – Ria Lewerke 
 Logo – Sue Reilly
 Photography – Brian Aris
 Management – Harriet Wasserman

Chart performance
The album spent 35 weeks on the US Billboard album charts and reached its peak position of No. 15 in early February 1985.

Certifications

References

External links
 

1984 albums
Sheena Easton albums
EMI Records albums